"In Too Deep" is the fourth track on the 1986 Genesis album Invisible Touch. It was released as the second single from the LP in the UK and the fifth single in the US. The single was a success in America during the summer of 1987; it reached the  spot on the US Billboard Hot 100 chart, and the  spot on the Adult Contemporary chart. The song was only performed live during the 1986 North American legs during the Genesis 1986–87 Invisible Touch world tour. An October 1986 performance of the song was included on the 1992 live album The Shorts.

"In Too Deep" is featured in the 2000 American crime/thriller American Psycho, as well as in the 1986 British neo-noir film Mona Lisa; for the latter the song won the "Most Performed Song from a Film" award at the BMI Film & TV Awards in 1988.

Background
The lyric was written by Phil Collins after he was approached to write a song for the soundtrack of the movie Mona Lisa. The music is credited to the entire band in common with all the tracks on Invisible Touch.

Cash Box praised Collins' "impassioned vocal."

Personnel 
 Tony Banks – keyboards
 Phil Collins – vocals, drums, percussion
 Mike Rutherford – acoustic and electric guitars, bass guitar

Charts

Weekly charts

Year-end charts

Music video
The music video for the song features the three band members playing on a minimalist set composed of steps and platforms. Tony Banks plays a grand piano, although the recording itself is mainly electric, while Mike Rutherford mime acoustic guitar and Phil Collins vocals and drums.

In popular culture
The song features in the movie Mona Lisa during a sequence in which Bob Hoskins's character investigates the sex establishments of Soho.

In the 2000 American psychological thriller film American Psycho, Patrick Bateman (played by Christian Bale) describes the song as "the most moving pop song of the 1980s, about monogamy and commitment. The song is extremely uplifting. The lyrics are as positive and affirmative as anything I've heard in rock."

References

External links
 https://genius.com/Genesis-in-too-deep-lyrics

1986 songs
1987 singles
Genesis (band) songs
1980s ballads
Pop ballads
Songs written by Tony Banks (musician)
Songs written by Phil Collins
Songs written by Mike Rutherford
Song recordings produced by Hugh Padgham